Asen Nikolov (born 28 July 1951) is a Bulgarian boxer. He competed in the men's light flyweight event at the 1972 Summer Olympics.

References

External links
 

1951 births
Living people
Bulgarian male boxers
Olympic boxers of Bulgaria
Boxers at the 1972 Summer Olympics
Place of birth missing (living people)
Light-flyweight boxers